The National Science and Technology Development Agency (NSTDA) is an agency of the government of Thailand which supports research in science and technology and its application in the Thai economy.

See also 
 NSTDA affiliated institutions
 Research centers
 National Center for Genetic Engineering and Biotechnology (BIOTEC)
 National Metal and Materials Technology Center (MTEC)
 National Nanotechnology Center (NANOTEC)
 National Electronics and Computer Technology Center (NECTEC)
 Thailand Science Park
 Software Park Thailand
 Thailand Advanced Institute of Science and Technology (TAIST), with Tokyo Institute of Technology and Thai universities
 Thailand Graduate Institute of Science and Technology (TGIST)
 Thailand Research Fund (TRF)

References

External links
 National Science and Technology Development Agency

 
Science and technology in Thailand
Investment promotion agencies
Public organizations of Thailand